Teal Inlet, once named Evelyn Station, is a settlement on East Falkland, in the Falkland Islands, on the south shore of Salvador Water. It is overshadowed by Jack's Mountain.

The settlement played a minor part in the Falklands War, when British troops, who had established a bridgehead at San Carlos Water, divided into two, with one group going to fight at Goose Green and the other travelling along the northern part of East Falkland, by Teal Inlet. Teal Inlet was used as a harbour of refuge by 11th MCM Squadron ships to shelter from air attacks by day during the final assault on Port Stanley.

References

Populated places on East Falkland